Burak Albayrak (born 12 January 1998) is a Turkish footballer who plays as a defender for TFF Second League club Kırklarelispor on loan from Çaykur Rizespor.

Professional career
Albayrak made his professional debut with Çaykur Rizespor in a 1-1 Turkish Cup tie with Galatasaray on 15 January 2020.

References

External links
 TFF Profile
 Soccerway Profile
 Mackolik Profile

1998 births
Living people
People from Ümraniye
Footballers from Istanbul
Turkish footballers
Turkey youth international footballers
Çaykur Rizespor footballers
Niğde Anadolu FK footballers
Süper Lig players
Association football defenders